The canton of Saint-Vallier is an administrative division of the Saône-et-Loire department, eastern France. It was created at the French canton reorganisation which came into effect in March 2015. Its seat is in Saint-Vallier.

It consists of the following communes:
Ciry-le-Noble
Génelard
Perrecy-les-Forges
Saint-Vallier
Sanvignes-les-Mines

References

Cantons of Saône-et-Loire